Nucleoporin 214 (Nup2014) is a protein that in humans is encoded by the NUP214 gene.

Function 

The nuclear pore complex is a massive structure that extends across the nuclear envelope, forming a gateway that regulates the flow of macromolecules between the nucleus and the cytoplasm. Nucleoporins are the main components of the nuclear pore complex in eukaryotic cells. This gene is a member of the FG-repeat-containing nucleoporins. The protein encoded by this gene is localized to the cytoplasmic face of the nuclear pore complex where it is required for proper cell cycle progression and nucleocytoplasmic transport. The 3' portion of this gene forms a fusion gene with the DEK gene on chromosome 6 in a t(6,9) translocation associated with acute myeloid leukemia and myelodysplastic syndrome.

Structure 

The structure of the N-terminal domain of Nup214 reveals a sevenbladed beta-propeller fold followed by a 30-residue C-terminal extended peptide segment (CTE). The CTE folds back onto the beta propeller and binds to its bottom face. The structure of the Nup214 NTD bound to the helicase Ddx19 in its ADP-bound state reveals the molecular basis for the interaction between the two proteins. A conserved residue of Ddx19 is shown to be crucial for complex formation in vitro and in vivo. Strikingly, the interaction surfaces exhibit strongly opposing surface potentials, with the helicase surface being positively and the Nup214 surface being negatively charged. Ddx19 is shown to bind RNA only in its ATP-bound state, and the binding of RNA and the Nup214 NTD is mutually exclusive.

Interactions 

NUP214 has been shown to interact with:
 DDX19,
 CRM1
 NXF1, and
 NXF2,  and
 ZFP36.

References

Further reading 

 
 
 
 
 
 
 
 
 
 
 
 
 
 
 
 
 

Nuclear pore complex